Rony Kordab (born June 5, 2004), known professionally as RealestK, is a Canadian singer and songwriter. He rose to fame in 2021 with his breakout single "WFM", which reached number 67 on the Billboard Hot 100. He then received co-signs from fellow Canadian musicians Nav and Drake, and collaborated with the former in late 2022 on the song "Lost Me" from his fourth studio album, Demons Protected by Angels. RealestK released his debut studio album, Dreams 2 Reality, that same year.

Early life
Rony Kordab was born on June 5, 2004, in Toronto, Canada, specifically in Scarborough. Both his parents were born and raised in Beirut, Lebanon and he has an older brother. He Also attended Senator O'Connor College School.

Career 
On October 6, 2021, RealestK released the single "WFM", alongside its music video. The singer recalled editing the video during a business class, in which his teacher lectured him, but he still continued to do it. The song debuted at number 73 on the Billboard Hot 100 and reached number 67 the following week.

On September 9, 2022, RealestK released a collaboration with Canadian rapper Nav titled "Lost Me", which appeared as the fourteenth track from the latter's fourth studio album, Demons Protected by Angels. The music video for the song premiered the following day. The song serves as his first time working with another artist and Nav also brought him out at Rolling Loud in their hometown of Toronto to perform the song. After releasing some more singles, RealestK released his debut studio album, Dreams 2 Reality, on October 28, 2022.

Artistry
Alex Nino Gheciu of Complex, who interviewed RealestK in February 2022 felt that "RealestK's songs are full of raw candour and vulnerability—he yearns for something real amid an increasingly soulless and nihilistic age" and added that "he's got the lived-in, heart-wrecked conviction of someone twice his age, and one of the most captivating new voices in Canadian R&B".

Discography

Studio albums

Singles

Guest appearance

References

2004 births
Canadian contemporary R&B singers
Living people
Canadian singer-songwriters
Musicians from Toronto